Yuquan is a town in Qinzhou District, Tianshui, Gansu province, China. , it administers the following 32 residential neighborhoods:
Yuquan
Nanhu
Shuangxi
Wangjiamo
Yanhe
Sunjiaping
Binglingsi
Liguanwan
Caojiaya
Qilidun
Yanchi
Xujiashan
Yanpu
Liujiazhuang
Malan
Huangcheng
Wangjiaping
Yanghe
Shimaping
Zuojiachang
Wayaopo
Zaoyuan
Dongtuanzhuang
Lianting
Tianshuijun
Nuanhewan
Dongshili
Dongfanghong
Fuxi Road
Yanxin
Xituanzhuang
Xishili

References

Township-level divisions of Gansu
Tianshui